Funky Elephant is an annual springtime music festival in Helsinki, Finland. It's dedicated to a vast variety of styles within black rhythm music. Genres represented include funk, soul, Hip hop, jazz, Latin, reggae, afrobeat etc. Funky Elephant has been organized since 1994.

Location
The festival is held at Tavastia Club and its smaller sub-club downstairs, Semifinal. The clubs are located in the very center of Helsinki.

Performers
The festival has had such performers as
 Sharon Jones & The Dap-Kings
 Roy Ayers
 Joe Bataan
 Pucho & the Latin Soul Brothers
 Tony Allen
 DJ Vadim & One Self

Overall, the festival has had over 100 live performances and over 70 DJs.

Organiser and other events
The organizer is Funky Amigos, which is a non-profit association. Its aim is to enhance the status of modern rhythm music scene and its artists in Finland. In wider prospect, Funky Amigos also wants to encourage multi-culturality and tolerance.

Other Funky Amigos' events include
 The Funk Awards, a gala event to give recognition to those Finns who have kept the scene showcased domestically. Held annually since 2000.
 The Baby Elephant Tour, a chance for the lesser-known, up and coming Finnish artists to tour clubs around Finland.

External links
 

Jazz festivals in Finland
Festivals in Helsinki
Music festivals established in 1994
Spring (season) events in Finland